Pär-Gunnar Jönsson (born 6 August 1963) is a retired badminton player from Sweden.

Career
He won the bronze medal at the 1993 IBF World Championships in men's doubles with Peter Axelsson.

Achievements

World Championships 
Men's doubles

World Cup 
Men's doubles

IBF World Grand Prix 
The World Badminton Grand Prix sanctioned by International Badminton Federation (IBF) from 1983 to 2006.

Men's doubles

References

External links
 
 
 

Swedish male badminton players
Living people
1963 births
Badminton players at the 1992 Summer Olympics
Olympic badminton players of Sweden
Badminton players at the 1996 Summer Olympics
Badminton players at the 2000 Summer Olympics
World No. 1 badminton players
Sportspeople from Gothenburg
20th-century Swedish people